Otto Breg (27 November 1949 – 3 January 2010) was an Austrian bobsledder. He competed in the four man event at the 1976 Winter Olympics.

References

External links
 

1949 births
2010 deaths
Austrian male bobsledders
Olympic bobsledders of Austria
Bobsledders at the 1976 Winter Olympics
People from Bruck an der Mur
Sportspeople from Styria